"Sink, Florida, Sink" is a song by the Gainesville, Florida-based punk rock band Against Me!, released as the second single from their 2003 album Against Me! as the Eternal Cowboy. While the album was released by Fat Wreck Chords, the 7-inch singles for "Sink, Florida, Sink" and "Cavalier Eternal" were released by the band's previous label No Idea Records, using alternate versions of the songs that differ from the versions on the album.

Background
For the recording of their second album, Against Me! as the Eternal Cowboy, Against Me! chose work with producer Rob McGregor, who had recorded their first album and two previous EPs. The bulk of the album was recorded at Ardent Studios in Memphis, Tennessee, where the band could make an all-analog recording with very few overdubs. During the sessions they recorded both acoustic and electric versions of several songs, and decided to release some of the alternate versions as 7" singles through their previous label No Idea Records. Acoustic renditions of "Sink, Florida, Sink" and "Unsubstantiated Rumors Are Good Enough for Me to Base My Life Upon" were used on the album, which was released November 3, 2003. The electric version of "Sink, Florida, Sink" was first released on the Fat Wreck Chords compilation album Rock Against Bush, Vol. 1 in April 2004. The single was released the following year, including the electric versions of "Sink, Florida, Sink" and "Unsubstantiated Rumors Are Good Enough for Me to Base My Life Upon". The single's die-cut, fold-out cover was designed by artist Chris Norris.

Track listing

All songwriting by Laura Jane Grace.

Personnel

Band
 Laura Jane Grace – guitar, lead vocals
 James Bowman  – guitar, backing vocals
 Andrew Seward – bass guitar, backing vocals
 Warren Oakes – drums

Production
 Rob McGregor – producer
 Pete Matthews – mixing engineer, engineer
 Adam Hill – assistant engineer
 Brad Blackwoon – mastering
 Chris Norris – artwork

See also
Against Me! discography

References

External links
 "Sink, Florida, Sink" at Against Me!'s official website – includes links to song lyrics
 "Sink, Florida, Sink" at No Idea Records
 www.SinkFloridaSink.com Website inspired by the Against Me! song.

2005 singles
Against Me! songs
Songs written by Laura Jane Grace
2003 songs
Songs against capitalism
Songs about Florida
Songs about floods
Environmental songs